is a 2013 motion picture starring the J-Pop group Dempagumi.inc, and directed by Koichi Sakamoto, who is known for directing the Super Sentai Series.

Story 
The "Shiromajo Gakuen" (White Witches Academy), is a girls school where students learn witchcraft. The new students are Moga Shiratori (Moga Mogami), Nemu Watanuki (Nemu Yumemi), Mirin Yukino (Mirin Furukawa), Eimi Odamaki (Eimi Naruse) and Ayane Shiomi (Ayane Fujisaki). They all have their hearts broken and have a deep emotional pain. Older students directed by Risa Kikuta (Risa Aizawa) assign tasks to the group of new students. Tasks are steps to acquire sorcery skills. The actresses of the film are known from Dempagumi.inc group, between members are known Arisa Komiya (Tokumei Sentai Go-Busters), Hikari Takara (GTO - 2012) and Kasumi Yamaya (Kamen Rider × Kamen Rider Wizard & Fourze: Movie War Ultimatum, Shuriken Sentai Ninnninger). It is a co-production between TV Asahi and Toei Company, and brings a lot of action mixed with ecchi elements.

A sequel, titled Shiromajo Gakuen: Owari to Hajimari was released on June 13, 2015, and can be seen worldwide at Viki.

Cast of characters 

 Dempagumi.inc

Shiromajo Gakuen (Innocent Lilies)

White Witches

 Moga Mogami as Moga Shiratori
 Nemu Yumemi as Nemu Watanuki
 Mirin Furukawa as Mirin Yukino
 Eimi Naruse as Eimi Odamaki
 Ayane Fujisaki as Ayane Shiomi
 Risa Aizawa as Risa Kikuta
 Arisa Komiya as Anzu Mikumo
 Hikari Takara as Nigera Hishimochi
 Kasumi Yamaya as Kasumi Shiratori
 Sae Shiraishi as Natsuyo Momota
 Yu Aikawa as Fuyuko Kashiwagi

Shiromajo Gakuen: Owari to Hajimari (Innocent Lilies 2)

White Witches

 Moga Mogami as Moga Shiratori
 Nemu Yumemi as Nemu Watanuki
 Mirin Furukawa as Mirin Yukino
 Eimi Naruse as Eimi Odamaki
 Ayane Fujisaki as Ayane Shiomi
 Risa Aizawa as Risa Kikuta 
 Rina Koike as Rina Kinugasa

Black Witches

 Miyuki Torii as Sumire Otogiri
 Fuuka Nishihira as Misaki Tachibana
 Nina Endo as Seiko Aso
 Rin Honoka as Machiko
 Usa Sakurano as Akari

 Syuusuke Saito as Tera
 Ibuki Tsuji as Herumu
 Sho Tomita as Igunisu

 Mao Ichimichi as Ran Hayakawa
 Haruka Tomatsu as Akua
 Kasumi Yamaya as Kasumi Shiratori

See also 
 Majisuka Gakuen 
 Sailor Moon

External links 
  
Shiromajo Gakuen (IMDB)

2013 films
Films about witchcraft
Tokusatsu films
2010s Japanese films